Thomas Druyen (born July 2, 1957 in Süchteln, now Viersen) is a German sociologist and director of two institutes at the Sigmund Freud Private University in Vienna. In addition to his work as a speaker and author - especially on philosophical and contemporary topics - Druyen focuses his research on the psychological and neural conditions as well as the accompanying phenomena of shaping the future, digitization and demographic change. He also deals with the psychology and life of the wealthy. As one of the most important researchers in the field of wealth research, Druyen is regularly present in various print and audiovisual media.

Personal life 
From 1996 to 2013, Druyen was married to actress Jenny Jürgens.

In September 2016 he married Konstanze Bruhns. Druyen lives in Düsseldorf.

Scientific career

Druyen studied law, sociology, media science and philology at the University of Münster as well as anthropology at the University of Colombo. He graduated from the University of Münster with a Master of Arts degree in 1988, completed a PhD in 1990 and his postdoctoral qualification in 2004. In the same year he was appointed honorary professor at the Department of Economic and Social Sciences of the University of Győr. From 1999 to 2004 he was director of the Institute for Dialogue of the Generations. Druyen has been teaching at the Institute of Sociology of the Westfälische Wilhelms-Universität Münster since 2004 and was Director of the Investment Research Forum from 2006 to 2010. He also worked at the Institute for Cultural and Media Management at Freie Universität Berlin from 2005 to 2007.

From 2000 to 2004, Druyen was chairman of the Swiss Peter Ustinov Foundation. From 2001 to 2014, Druyen was president of the board of trustees of the "Dialog der Generationen" foundation in Düsseldorf, founded in 1999 and now dissolved. From 2003 to 2007 he worked for LGT Privatbank in Liechtenstein and was editor-in-chief of the customer magazine "Credo". Likewise he was chairman of the board of trustees of the foundation Kloster Steinfeld from 2004 to 2009. Since 2007, Druyen has been Full Professor of the Chair of Comparative Culture of Wealth and Wealth Psychology and since 2009 Director of the Institute of Wealthibility and Wealth Psychology and the Institute for Future Psychology and Future Management, both at the Sigmund Freud Private University in Vienna.

Scientific field of research

Demographic change 
Druyen counters the generally negative image of age with a positive image. It is important to discover the new potential of old age and to exploit the resulting opportunities for the general public. He calls for a corresponding social reassessment of age and, among other things, reveals to what extent the subjective self-perception of many older people fundamentally conflicts with the social fears of aging. His 2003 book "Olympus of life - the new picture of the age" found entrance into numerous public debates, and prepared at the same time the basis for its further research field of the culture of wealth by further developing basic elements from the demographic research and thus reaching an overall social dimension.

Wealth research, culture of wealth and wealth psychology 
In his cultural and psychological studies, Druyen examines, among other things, the influence of private financial wealth on society and the impact of large material wealth on the human psyche. To this end, Druyen conducted interviews with wealthy and super rich people worldwide (starting at about 30 million US dollars in net financial assets to several billion US dollars of free capital) and published numerous books and studies. In his much-acclaimed 2007 book, "Goldkinder - Die Welt des Vermögens", Druyen makes a distinction between wealth on the one hand and fortune on the other, and shapes the notion of wealth culture, While the concept of “The Rich” encompasses all those quantitative variables that are measurable in any way, the concept of wealth also includes its qualitative use and its individual requirements. By "wealth culture" Druyen understands the promotion and maintenance of material and immaterial values for the protection of the individual and social viability. His wealth research thus focuses on the group of people who, in addition to self-chosen parts of their wealth, also use their abilities, their know-how and their sense of responsibility to help shape social development. In addition to the social prerequisites and consequences of such an understanding of the culture of wealth, Druyen also examines the psychic interactions between extraordinary material wealth and the attitudes and ways of life arising from it. Among other things, he noted that wealthy people are not necessarily happier, but are usually one step closer to the future than the average person.

Competence and readiness for change 
Druyen's research on individual capacity for change and willingness to change is based on his research on demographic change, but here he takes a more socio-psychological perspective. In this sense, he sees demographic change as a prime example of the fact that the majority of people repress existing impulses, despite better knowledge, instead of dealing with them and make them active. Druyen reveals this "preventive incompetence" in his 2015 generation study, in which people from three different generations were questioned about their respective visions of the future. In his opinion, this is a reoccurring theme throughout the whole of human history. The results of the study laid the foundation for the field of future psychology.

Future Psychology 
The psychology of the future focuses primarily on the areas of anticipation and prospection in an age characterized by accelerated change, digitization and virtuality. The ideas and fantasies of the future are collected in partly interactive surveys, in which robots and avatars are also used. In a conventional and population-representative survey from 2018 Druyen was able to show that the Germans are on the one hand very resilient and adaptable, on the other hand, but little future-optimistic and forward-looking acting. The goal of future psychological research is to understand the effects of future concepts and new technologies on thinking and acting and to derive action-guiding strategies in the sense of optimizing change.

Awards

 2018: Order of Merit of North Rhine-Westphalia

Publications

Menschendämmerung. 
 Die Wahrnehmung der Pluralität. 
 Die Zukunft des Alters. 
 Olymp des Lebens – Das neue Bild des Alters. 
 Goldkinder – Die Welt des Vermögens. 
 Reichtum und Vermögen – Zur gesellschaftlichen Bedeutung der Reichtums- und Vermögensforschung. 
 Vermögen in Deutschland – Heterogenität und Verantwortung. 
 Vermögenskultur – Verantwortung im 21. Jahrhundert. 
 Happy Princes – The Empowerment of Wealthibility. 
 Krieg der Scheinheiligkeit. Plädoyer für einen gesunden Menschenverstand. 
 Verantwortung und Bewährung: eine vermögenskulturelle Studie. 
 Drei Generationen im Gespräch – Eine Studie zum intergenerativen Zukunftsmanagement. 
 Die ultimative Herausforderung. Über die Veränderungsfähigkeit der Deutschen.

References

External links
Publications of and about Thomas Druyen in the catalogue of the German National Bibliography
 Homepage of Thomas Druyen
 Druyen at the Homepage of the Institute of Wealthibility and Wealth Psychology at the Sigmund Freud Private University in Vienna
 Druyen at the Homepage of the Institute for Future Psychology and Future Management at the Sigmund Freud Private University in Vienna

German sociologists
1957 births
Living people
German male writers